West Branch is a hamlet located in the Town of Lee in Oneida County, New York, United States. It is located on New York State Route 26.

References

Hamlets in Oneida County, New York